The Blow-Me-Down Covered Bridge is a historic wooden covered bridge carrying Lang Road over Blow-me-down Brook in the town of Cornish, near its northern border with Plainfield, New Hampshire. Built in 1877, the kingpost structure is one of the state's few surviving 19th-century covered bridges. The bridge was listed on the National Register of Historic Places in 1978.

Description
The Blow-Me-Down Covered Bridge is located in a rural section of Cornish, spanning Blow-me-down Brook on Lang Road a short way west of its junction with Platt Road. It rests on natural granite ledges which have been levelled with dry-laid stone. It is covered by a metal roof, with vertical board siding on the sides and around the portals.

History 
The bridge was built in 1877 by James Frederick Tasker (1826–1903) for $528. The bridge was restored in 1980, and again in 2002. Its single lane is open to vehicular traffic, with a posted weight limit.

See also

Other bridges in Cornish
 Dingleton Hill Covered Bridge
 Blacksmith Shop or Kenyon Bridge, foot traffic only
 Cornish–Windsor Covered Bridge

Bridges in West Windsor, Vermont
 Bowers Covered Bridge
 Best's Covered Bridge

List of bridges
 List of covered bridges in New Hampshire

National Register listings of area bridges
 National Register of Historic Places listings in Sullivan County, New Hampshire
 List of bridges on the National Register of Historic Places in New Hampshire

References

External links

Blow-Me-Down Bridge, New Hampshire Division of Historical Resources (dated info)

Covered bridges on the National Register of Historic Places in New Hampshire
Bridges completed in 1877
Wooden bridges in New Hampshire
Tourist attractions in Sullivan County, New Hampshire
Bridges in Sullivan County, New Hampshire
National Register of Historic Places in Sullivan County, New Hampshire
Cornish, New Hampshire
Road bridges on the National Register of Historic Places in New Hampshire
King post truss bridges in the United States
1877 establishments in New Hampshire